Cazuo Matsumoto (born August 2, 1985) is a Brazilian table tennis player. He competed at the 2016 Summer Olympics as part of the Brazilian team in the men's team event.

References

1985 births
Living people
Brazilian male table tennis players
Brazilian people of Japanese descent
Olympic table tennis players of Brazil
Table tennis players at the 2016 Summer Olympics
South American Games gold medalists for Brazil
South American Games silver medalists for Brazil
South American Games medalists in table tennis
Competitors at the 2006 South American Games
20th-century Brazilian people
21st-century Brazilian people